Helladotherium is an extinct genus of sivatherine giraffid from Europe, Africa, and Asia during the Miocene.  The most complete skeleton is that of a female, based on a comparison with an intact female Sivatherium giganteum skull.

Only two species of Helladotherium have been discovered, with H. grande being larger than H. duvernoyi. The former has been found only in Pakistan.

List of species
 Helladotherium duvernoyi
 Helladotherium grande

References

Sources
 The Evolution of Artiodactyls by Donald R. Prothero and Scott E. Foss  
 Mammoths, Sabertooths, and Hominids by Jordi Agusti and Mauricio Anton  
 Classification of Mammals by Malcolm C. McKenna and Susan K. Bell

See also 

 Sivatherium
 Giraffokeryx
 Palaeotragus
 Hydaspitherium

Miocene even-toed ungulates
Prehistoric giraffes
Miocene mammals of Africa
Miocene mammals of Asia
Prehistoric mammals of Europe
Prehistoric even-toed ungulate genera